Mary J. Hodder (born April 5, 1945) is a Canadian former politician. She represented the riding of Burin-Placentia West in the Newfoundland and Labrador House of Assembly from 1996 to 2003 as a member of the Liberal Party.

The daughter of Joseph Pittman and Elizabeth Drake, she worked for the Avalon Telephone Company from 1964 to 1967. In 1966, she married Samuel H. Hodder. She served as deputy mayor for Marystown.

She was elected to the Newfoundland assembly in 1996 and reelected in 1999. Hodder did not run for reelection in 2003.

References

Liberal Party of Newfoundland and Labrador MHAs
Women MHAs in Newfoundland and Labrador
Living people
1945 births
21st-century Canadian politicians
21st-century Canadian women politicians